Roland Calvin Calhoun (February 18, 1913 – March 1985) was an American Negro league pitcher in the 1930s.

A native of Greenwood, South Carolina, Calhoun played for the Pittsburgh Crawfords and the Washington Black Senators in 1938. In five recorded appearances on the mound, he posted a 10.05 ERA over 14.1 innings. Calhoun died in Oakmont, Pennsylvania in 1985 at age 72.

References

External links
 and Seamheads

1913 births
1985 deaths
Date of death missing
Pittsburgh Crawfords players
Washington Black Senators players
Baseball pitchers
Baseball players from South Carolina
People from Greenwood, South Carolina
20th-century African-American sportspeople